Herman Fred Krueger (April 5, 1894 – August 19, 1991) was an American politician and aviator who served in the Wyoming House of Representatives and as the Speaker of the House as a Democrat.

Life

Herman Fred Krueger was born in Bern, Kansas on April 5, 1894 to German immigrants Otto Frederick Krueger and Virginia F. Harvey. He attended public schools in Nebraska and went to Peru State College. During World War I, he joined the U.S. Army's aviation section and fought over Italy and Austria, for which he received the Italian War Cross. After the war he returned to his family's home in Kansas, but moved to Wyoming in 1920. In 1925, he married Celia Gordon in Deer Lodge, Montana.

Krueger was elected to the state house to represent as one of Park County's representatives, served until 1939, and was later elected to another term from 1941 to 1943. In the 1936 house elections the Democratic Party retained control over the house and on January 12, 1937 he was elected as Speaker of the House with 38 votes against the Republican nominee's, Max Russell, 18 votes.

On August 19, 1991, he died at his home in Powell, Wyoming. At the time of his death, he was the last pilot from World War I in Wyoming.

References

External links

1894 births
1991 deaths
20th-century American politicians
United States Army personnel of World War I
Aviators from Wyoming
Military personnel from Kansas
People from Nemaha County, Kansas
People from Powell, Wyoming
Recipients of the War Merit Cross (Italy)
Speakers of the Wyoming House of Representatives
Democratic Party members of the Wyoming House of Representatives
United States Army Air Service pilots of World War I